Gurband Rural District is a rural district (dehestan) in the Central District of Minab County, Hormozgan Province, Iran. At the 2006 census, its population was 16,513, in 3,569 families. The rural district has 11 villages.

References 

Rural Districts of Hormozgan Province
Minab County